Christine Chapman (born 7 April 1956) is a Welsh Labour Co-operative politician who was a Member of the National Assembly for Wales for Cynon Valley from 1999 to 2016.

She has not held senior government posts and has been described as "one of the quietest women AMs ... [whose] effectiveness lies in her quiet willingness to discuss".

Education
Chapman was born in Porth, Rhondda and educated at Porth County Girls' School. She then went to the University of Wales, Aberystwyth and graduated with a Bachelor of Arts degree in Classical Studies and History in 1978, and to South Bank Polytechnic where she obtained a Diploma in Careers Guidance. She earned a Master's degree in Economics at Cardiff University and a Postgraduate Certificate in Education at the University of Swansea.

Career
She worked as a teacher, school careers adviser, and Compact Manager with Mid-Glamorgan Education Business Partnership. She was later co-ordinator for Torfaen Education Business Partnership and non-Executive Director of Mid-Glamorgan Careers Ltd. She obtained professional membership of the Institute of Careers Guidance.

Politics
Chapman served as a Labour Party member of Rhondda Cynon Taff County Borough Council representing Ynysybwl and Coed y Cwm. In the 1999 election, Chapman was elected as AM for Cynon Valley, withstanding a strong advance by Plaid Cymru.

She chaired the Objective One Programme Monitoring Committee from 2000 to 2004, finding the time to complete an MPhil degree at Cardiff University in June 2001. In January 2005 Chapman was appointed as a Deputy Minister in the Welsh Assembly Government, responsible for Education and Lifelong Learning, and Finance, Local Government and Public Services.

She was Chair of the Assembly's Women and Democracy Group and Secretary of the Labour UNISON Group. She supported the "Children Are Unbeatable Alliance" which seeks prohibit all corporal or physical punishment of children.

Chapman stood down in 2016 and was succeeded at the 2016 Welsh Assembly elections by Vikki Howells.

References

External links

Christine Chapman AM Official site

Offices held

1956 births
Living people
Alumni of Cardiff University
Labour Co-operative members of the Senedd
Wales AMs 1999–2003
Wales AMs 2003–2007
Wales AMs 2007–2011
Wales AMs 2011–2016
Members of the Welsh Assembly Government
People from Porth
Female members of the Senedd
Members of Rhondda Cynon Taf County Borough Council
20th-century British women politicians
Women members of the Welsh Assembly Government
Women councillors in Wales